Bizhanabad may refer to various places in Iran:
 Bizhanabad, Bardsir, Kerman Province
 Bizhanabad 1, Kerman Province
 Bizhanabad 2, Kerman Province
 Bizhanabad-e Sofla, alternate name of Azizabad, Rudbar-e Jonubi, Kerman Province
 Bizhanabad-e Vosta, Kerman Province
 Bizhanabad, South Khorasan
 Bizhanabad, West Azerbaijan